The Ministry of Agriculture of the Republic of Lithuania is a government department of the Republic of Lithuania. Its operations are authorized by the Constitution of the Republic of Lithuania, decrees issued by the President and Prime Minister, and laws passed by the Seimas (Parliament). Its mission is to prosecute state policy realization and coordination in ranges of land, food, fishery, village development, agriculture. The current head of the Ministry is Kęstutis Navickas.

Ministers

References

 
Agriculture
Lithuania
Agricultural organizations based in Lithuania